The 2020 season was Pahang's 17th season in the Malaysia Super League since its inception in 2004.

Management team

Squad

Transfers

In
1st leg

Out

1st Leg

2nd Leg

Retained

Friendlies

Pre Season

Mid Season

Competitions

Overview

Malaysia Super League

League table

Matches

Malaysia Cup

Statistics

Appearances and goals

Notes

References 

Sri Pahang FC
Sri Pahang FC seasons
2020 in Malaysian football
Sri Pahang